Silvia Rivera Cusicanqui (born 1949) is a Bolivian feminist, sociologist, historian, and subaltern theorist. She is Emeritus Professor at the Universidad Mayor de San Andrés in La Paz, Bolivia, where she taught Sociology for over thirty years. She draws upon anarchist theory as well as Quechua and Aymara cosmologies. She is a former director and longtime member of the Taller de Historia Oral Andina (Workshop on Andean Oral History). The Taller de Historia Oral Andina has conducted an ongoing critique of Western epistemologies through writings and activism for nearly two decades. She is also an activist who works directly with indigenous movements in Bolivia, such as the Katarista movement and the coca growers movement.

Some of her best-known works include Oppressed But Not Defeated: Peasant Struggles Among the Aymara and Quechua in Bolivia, 1900–1980 (Geneva: UNRISD, 1984), Ch'ixinakax Utxiwa: A Reflection on the Practices and Discourses of Decolonization and The politics and ideology of the Colombian peasant movement: the case of ANUC (National Association of Peasant Smallholders).

Education 
Cusicanqui earned a degree in Sociology from the Universidad Mayor de San Andrés in 1976 and a Masters degree in Social Sciences from Pontifical Catholic University of Peru in 1979.

Bibliography 
 Silvia Rivera Cusicanqui. 2020. Ch'ixinakax utxiwa: On Decolonising Practices and Discourses, Polity, 80 pp. . 
Silvia Rivera Cusicanqui. 2012. Violencia (re)encubiertas en Bolivia. Editor La Mirada Salvaje, 272 pp. .
 Silvia Rivera Cusicanqui. 2008. Pueblos originarios y estado. Vol. 2 de Gestión pública intercultural, Gestión pública intercultural. Azul Editores, 82 pp.  .
 Silvia Rivera Cusicanqui. 2003. Las fronteras de la coca: epistemologías coloniales y circuitos alternativos de la hoja de coca: el caso de la frontera boliviano-Argentina. Editor IDIS, 198 pp.
 Silvia Rivera Cusicanqui. 2002. Bircholas: trabajo de mujeres: explotación capitalista o opresión colonial entre las migrantes aymaras de La Paz y El Alto. 2ª edición de Editorial Mama Huaco. 225 pp.
 Ramón Conde, Felipe Santos. 1992. Ayllus y Proyectos de Desarrollo en el Norte de Potosí. Serie ¿Cuál desarrollo?. Colaboró Univ. Mayor de San Andrés. Taller de Historia Oral Andina. Editor Aruwiyiri, 192 pp.
 Zulema Lehm, Silvia Rivera Cusicanqui. 1990. La Mujer andina en la historia. Nº 2 de Serie Cuadernos de formación. Colaboró Univ. Mayor de San Andrés. Taller de Historia Oral Andina. Ediciones del Thoa, 51 pp.
 Silvia Rivera Cusicanqui. 1988. Los artesanos libertarios y la ética del trabajo; Taller de Historia Oral Andina, La Paz.
 Silvia Rivera Cusicanqui. 1984. Oppressed But Not Defeated: Peasant Struggles Among the Aymara and Quechua in Bolivia, 1900–1980 (Oprimidos pero no Derrotados: la Lucha Campesina Entre los Aimaras y Quechuas en Bolivia). Ginebra: UNRISD, xiii + 222 pp.

References

External links
 Bolivian Anarchism and Indigenous Resistance: Interview with Silvia Rivera Cusicanqui
 Indigenous Anarchist Critique of Bolivia's 'Indigenous State': Interview with Silvia Rivera Cusicanqui

1949 births
Bolivian people of Aymara descent
Bolivian anarchists
20th-century Bolivian historians
Historians of Latin America
Living people
People from La Paz
Bolivian women sociologists
Bolivian sociologists
Historians of anarchism
Women historians
21st-century Bolivian historians